Lyria (Plicolyria) is a subgenus of sea snail, a marine gastropod mollusk in the family Volutidae.

Species 
Species within the subgenus Plicolyria include:

 Plicolyria boholensis Poppe, 1987 

 Plicolyria boucheti Bail & Poppe, 2004

 Plicolyria exorata Bouchet & Poppe, 1988

 Plicolyria grandidieri Bail, 2002

 Plicolyria guionneti Poppe & Conde, 2001

 Plicolyria kuniene Bouchet, 1979

 Plicolyria planicostata G. B. Sowerby III, 1903

 Plicolyria poppei Bail, 2002

References

External links
 Worms Link

Volutidae
Gastropod subgenera